Marchesi can refer to:

 Marchesi (title), or Marquess
 Blanche Marchesi (1863–1940), French opera singer and teacher, daughter of Mathilde Marchesi
 Concetto Marchesi (1878–1957), Italian politician
 Gerald Marchesi (1928–1990), Australian rules footballer 
 Gualtiero Marchesi (1930–2017), Italian chef
 Louis Marchesi (1898–1968), founder of the Round Table
 Luigi Marchesi (1754–1829), Italian castrato
 Marcello Marchesi (1912–1978), Italian comic writer and director
 Mathilde Marchesi, née Graumann (1821–1913), German opera singer and teacher
 Pompeo Marchesi (1783–1858), Italian sculptor 
 Rino Marchesi (b. 1937), Italian footballer
 Tommaso Marchesi (1773–1852), Italian composer